Campiglossa luxorientis is a species of tephritid or fruit flies in the genus Campiglossa of the family Tephritidae.

Distribution
The species is found in Mongolia, China, Russia.

References

Tephritinae
Insects described in 1940
Diptera of Asia